The South African Rugby Legends Association (SARLA) is a non-profit organisation operating in South Africa. It is composed of former Springboks and Provincial rugby union players and provides a platform from which retired professional rugby players can work with the development of rugby in previously disadvantaged areas. The objective of the association is to raise money in aid of charitable causes and to provide sports coaching and life skills training to youngsters from previously disadvantaged areas in the country. SARLA also runs the South African Rugby Union (SARU) endorsed sustainable development rugby programme named Vuka.

History 
The South African Rugby Legends was started by former Wallaby openside flanker Christopher Roche, who incorporated the organisation for altruistic purposes and transferred it to likeminded South African counterparts for $1.00. South African entrepreneur and Chief Executive Officer of Richmark Holdings Gavin Varejes and former Springbok rugby player John Allan then continued the development of the concept. SARLA comprises former Springboks and Provincial rugby players. Initially started with charitable games as objective, the association has evolved to provide programmes like ‘Legends Iqhawe’, ‘Legacy Parks’ and ‘Vuka’.

Current Legends in SARLA 
The following former rugby players currently form part of SARLA:
 Ian McIntosh
 Gary Teichmann
 Hennie le Roux
 Chester Williams
 Bennie Nortje
 Dave von Hoesslin
 Marc Watson
 Jacobus Hendrickus Heymans
 André Snyman

Legends Iqhawe and Legacy Parks 
The Legends Iqhawe (hero or champion in the Zulu language) program was created to provide coaching in sport and also life skills training to youngsters. The coaching and training takes place in Legacy Parks situated in previously disadvantaged areas in South Africa and is facilitated by a role model in the form of a sports personality. The program is sponsored by companies like van Dyck and Paracon.

Vuka Rugby Development Program 
SARLA started a grassroots rugby development programme called Vuka (awakening or wake up in the Zulu language) in 2008. Over 2000 disadvantaged youngsters in more than 80 schools in the Western Cape have been given an opportunity to develop rugby and life skills by partaking in the programme.

Press Coverage 
SARLA regularly features in the South African online and printed press. Selected press coverage includes:
 Coverage of SARLA Sports Challenge in News Online – Going Places
 Coverage of SARLA's support for Joost van der Westhuizen - IOL News
 Coverage of SARLA's support for Joost van der Westhuizen – ZAPlurk
 Coverage of SARLA's support for Joost van der Westhuizen – Sarie Magazine

Contribution to Charity 
SARLA and Gavin Varejes donate time and funds to a variety of charities. The legends Joost van der Westhuizen, David Von Hoesslin, Mac Masina and Riaan Erwee visited one of FEED South Africa's beneficiaries in the Alexandra Township; the Phutuditjaba Community centre where they visited and handed out blankets to elderly and bed-ridden citizens.

References

External links 
 
 Gavin Varejes

Rugby union in South Africa
Non-profit organisations based in South Africa